Elements of Persuasion, released March 29, 2005, is Dream Theater singer James LaBrie's first solo album under his name, and third solo project, his first two being Keep It to Yourself and MullMuzzler 2, which were released under his band MullMuzzler.

LaBrie hired new musicians, including guitarist Marco Sfogli from Italy and Richard Chycki as sound engineer. Despite the lineup change, the album is still based on the same general style used on the past two albums, although with a much heavier sound. This is the last of LaBrie's solo albums to feature drummer Mike Mangini, who would join Dream Theater five years later.

Concept and making
Elements of Persuasion was written over a period of two years primarily by James LaBrie and keyboardist Matt Guillory with production taking place any time LaBrie had "down time" from Dream Theater or other obligations. The pair would begin to construct songs together, then independently grow and evolve the works.  This process was facilitated by the pair sending MP3s back and forth to one another.
The pair knew that they wanted to produce a "very aggressive and heavy album" focused on vocal melodies and lyrics.  The lyrics of the songs discuss a range of issues from organized religion to dictatorial oppression.  "LaBrie explains Elements of Persuasion as the things that guide us during our lifetime and how at each stage of life certain things become much more important than others".

Influences
LaBrie cites several bands as influences for Elements of Persuasion, such as Mudvayne, Meshuggah, Linkin Park, and Sevendust, commenting "Those bands were saying something to us, and I like the way they were approaching their music.  I thought it was refreshing, intelligently done and just had a feel of its own."  The direct influences of these bands can be seen in songs such as "Lost", with its jazz-fusion vibe or "Smashed" with its Bruce Hornsby inspired piano melody.  Indirect influences include literature which LaBrie reads, social issues, personal observations, and integration within relationships.

Confusion with Octavarium

Dream Theater's eighth studio album, Octavarium, and LaBrie's Elements of Persuasion were both released in 2005, with fans awaiting the release of each. Elements of Persuasion was leaked prior to release by an unknown source and intentionally mislabeled as Octavarium. Due to the album featuring LaBrie's vocals, many fans believed the leak to be that of Dream Theater, which subsequently led to confusion among some fans at concerts and even some DJs playing incorrectly labeled tracks.

Track listing

Personnel 
James LaBrie - vocals
Marco Sfogli - lead and rhythm guitars
Matt Guillory - keyboards
Bryan Beller - bass
Mike Mangini - drums

Production 
Arranged and produced by James LaBrie and Matt Guillory
Drums recorded at Iguana Recording Studios; vocals, keyboards and all guitars recorded at Cawaja Sound
Vocals, guitars, keyboards and drums recorded by Richard Chycki; assistant drum engineer Steve Chahley, with second engineer Tom Wilson
Bass recorded at Ear Kandy Studios by Edmund Monsef
Mixed by Richard Chycki
All songs published by Bug Music

Notes

References
 "Interview: JAMES LaBRIE." Interview by John Stefanis. Get Ready to ROCK! 2005.
 LaBrie, James. "10 Questions for ... James LaBrie: Talkin' Rock 'N' Roll." Interview by Bryan Reesman. Goldmine 19 Aug. 2005: 26. Print.

External links
 James LaBrie official web site

2005 albums
James LaBrie albums
Inside Out Music albums